The 2018 Carlisle City Council election took place on 3 May 2018 to elect members of Carlisle District Council in Cumbria, England. One third of the council was up for election and the council remained in no overall control.

Overall result

Ward results

Belah

Belle Vue

Botcherby

Brampton

Castle

Currock

Dalston

Denton Holme

Harraby

Longtown and Rockcliffe

Morton

St Aidans

Stanwix Rural

Stanwix Urban

Upperby

Wetheral

Yewdale

By-elections between 2018 and 2019

References

Carlisle City Council elections
Carlisle